Ophiocordyceps formicarum is an entomopathogenic fungus belonging to the order Hypocreales (Ascomycota) in the family Ophiocordycipitaceae. The fungus was first described by mycologist George S. Kobayashi in 1939 as a species of Cordyceps. Originally found in Japan growing on an adult Hercules ant (Camponotus herculeanus var. obscuripes), it was reported from Guizhou, China, in 2003. It was transferred to the new genus Ophiocordyceps in 2007 when the family Cordycipitaceae was reorganized. A technique has been developed to grow the fungus in an agar growth medium supplemented with yeast extract, inosine, and glucose.

References

External links
 

Fungi described in 1939
Insect diseases
Animal fungal diseases
Ophiocordycipitaceae